The 1971 Israel Super Cup was the third Israel Super Cup (eighth, including unofficial matches, as the competition wasn't played within the Israel Football Association in its first 5 editions, until 1969), an annual Israel football match played between the winners of the previous season's Top Division and Israel State Cup. 

The match was played between Maccabi Netanya, champions of the 1970–71 Liga Leumit and Hakoah Ramat Gan, winners of the 1970–71 Israel State Cup.

At the match, played at Maccabi Netanya Stadium, Maccabi Netanya won 4–2 after extra time.

Match details

References

1971
Super Cup
Super Cup 1971
Super Cup 1971
Israel Super Cup matches